Marienborn station is a railway station in the municipality of Marienborn, located in the Börde district in Saxony-Anhalt, Germany.

Notable places nearby
Helmstedt–Marienborn border crossing

References

Railway stations in Saxony-Anhalt
Buildings and structures in Börde (district)
Railway stations in Germany opened in 1872